Look is the ninth extended play (EP) by South Korean girl group Apink. It was released by Play M Entertainment on April 13, 2020, one year and three months after their last EP Percent (2019), the group's longest break since debut. The album contains seven songs including the lead single "Dumhdurum".

Release and promotion
On April 1, 2020, Play M Entertainment announced the upcoming release of Apink's ninth extended play Look and lead single "Dumhdurum" on April 13. It marks the group's first release after one year and three months following their previous mini-album Percent (2019). A schedule for the comeback was posted via the group's SNS accounts, containing multiple dates for the release of teasers for the album. The first group teaser was released on April 2. On April 3, unit group teasers were released in two versions- 'YOS' and 'Ju-ji-rong. The full album tracklist was released on April 6. The EP consists of seven songs including two new tracks for fans. Preorders for the album began the same day. From April 7 to April 9, solo teasers for each member were released in sets of two. On April 10, a highlight medley video featuring previews of the songs from the album was released. A few hours ahead of the album release, a 50-second teaser of the performance version of the music video was released. The album was released on April 13, in both CD and digital formats. An accompanying music video for the lead single "Dumhdurum" was released in conjunction with the release of the album.

Hours after the album release, the group held an online showcase which was broadcast live via Naver's V Live app. The group performed songs from the album for the first time at the showcase. The group then promoted the album on music shows, starting with KBS's Music Bank on April 17, where they performed "Be Myself", "Love Is Blind" and "Dumhdurum". In the second week of promotion, Apink won all six music show awards on, The Show, Show Champion, M Countdown, Music Bank, Show! Music Core and Inkigayo. They won a total of 8 music show awards including consecutive wins on Show! Music Core and Inkigayo.

Composition
The album's lead single "Dumhdurum" has lyrics written by Jeon Gun and Black Eyed Pilseung, the same team who wrote Apink's previous hit singles "I’m So Sick" and "Eung Eung". It is a dance-driven number with an "addictive hook" and features a Spanish yet "Oriental" melody and synth sounds. The lyrics talk about accepting a broken relationship calmly. "Yummy" is a dance song with elements of R&B and features minimalist instrumentation and a "stylish" melody. "Be Myself" is a pop and R&B song featuring flute and keyboards. It is performed by Eunji, Cho-rong and Namjoo. "Love Is Blind" is a unit track performed by Bo-mi, Na-eun, and Ha-young and has lyrics written by Kim Yeonseo and music by MinGtion. It features a drum rhythm and derives from synthesizer and bass instrumentation. "Overwrite" is an R&B ballad with a restrained rhythm. It was written and produced by Dr.JO. The last two tracks of the album are released to mark their 9th anniversary and are both dedicated to their fans. "Moments" is a pop ballad with a "dramatic" melody. "Everybody Ready?" is an uptempo dance-pop-style song produced by Jinhwan Kim. It features a funk-based rhythm, "clapping beats", "brass-horns" and "energetic vocals". The lyrics are a celebration of their career.

Reception
The album debuted at number two on the Gaon Album Chart while "Dumhdurum" topped the Gaon Download Chart. "Dumhdurum" entered the Gaon Digital Chart at number four and peaked at number two in its second week. As of June 2020, Look has sold 47,937 physical copies.

Track listing

Awards and nominations

Accolades

Charts

Release history

References

2020 EPs
Korean-language EPs
Apink albums
Kakao M EPs